Fahad Al-Zahrani (born 2 February 1979) is a football midfielder. At the club level, he currently plays for Al-Nassr in Saudi Arabia.

Al-Zahrani joined Al-Nasr at the summer of 2007 on a one-year loan from Al-Ahli. In 2008, he moved permanently to Al-Nasr.

Al-Zahrani also played for Saudi Arabia at the 1999 FIFA World Youth Championship in Nigeria.

References

External links
 

1979 births
Living people
Saudi Arabian footballers
Al-Ahli Saudi FC players
Al Nassr FC players
Al-Fateh SC players
Al-Ansar FC (Medina) players
Al-Ain FC (Saudi Arabia) players
Saudi First Division League players
Saudi Professional League players
Saudi Second Division players
Association football midfielders